Fremont is a town in Wayne County, North Carolina, United States.  The population was 1,255 at the 2010 census.  It is included in the Goldsboro, North Carolina Metropolitan Statistical Area.

History
Originally named Nahunta, it was renamed Fremont in 1869 after Col. Sewall Lawrence Fremont, a former U.S. Army artilleryman and chief engineer of the Wilmington and Wheldon Railroad from 1854 to 1871.

The Aycock Birthplace, Barnes-Hooks Farm, and Dred and Ellen Yelverton House are listed on the National Register of Historic Places.

Geography
Fremont is located at  (35.543071, -77.974792).

Demographics

2020 census

As of the 2020 United States census, there were 1,196 people, 426 households, and 212 families residing in the town.

2000 census
As of the census of 2000, there were 1,463 people, 591 households, and 369 families residing in the town. The population density was 1,074.6 people per square mile (415.3/km2). There were 671 housing units at an average density of 492.9 per square mile (190.5/km2). The racial makeup of the town was 45.86% White, 50.72% African American, 0.21% Native American, 0.34% Asian, 2.32% from other races, and 0.55% from two or more races. Hispanic or Latino of any race were 2.67% of the population.

There were 591 households, out of which 27.4% had children under the age of 18 living with them, 39.1% were married couples living together, 19.8% had a female householder with no husband present, and 37.4% were non-families. 35.0% of all households were made up of individuals, and 18.6% had someone living alone who was 65 years of age or older. The average household size was 2.39 and the average family size was 3.11.

In the town, the population was spread out, with 25.8% under the age of 18, 6.1% from 18 to 24, 24.0% from 25 to 44, 24.1% from 45 to 64, and 20.0% who were 65 years of age or older. The median age was 41 years. For every 100 females, there were 81.3 males. For every 100 females age 18 and over, there were 77.0 males.

The median income for a household in the town was $25,167, and the median income for a family was $34,375. Males had a median income of $31,250 versus $18,869 for females. The per capita income for the town was $16,892. About 15.6% of families and 21.4% of the population were below the poverty line, including 34.6% of those under age 18 and 17.7% of those age 65 or over.

Education
Education in Fremont is administered by the Wayne County Public Schools system. Schools located in Fremont include Fremont STARS Elementary School, Norwayne Middle School and Charles B. Aycock High School. Higher education is offered through Wayne Community College in Goldsboro.

Transportation

Passenger
 Air: Fremont is served through nearby Kinston Regional Jetport  with service to Orlando, Florida. Raleigh-Durham International Airport is the closest major airport with service to more than 45 domestic and international destinations. Goldsboro-Wayne Municipal Airport is an airport located nearby, but is only used for general aviation.
 I-795 is the closest Interstate Highway on the outskirts of Fremont intersecting with NC 222, while Interstate 95 is located 15 miles west in Kenly.
 Fremont is not served directly by passenger trains. The closest Amtrak station is located in Wilson.
 Bus: The area is served by Greyhound with a location in nearby Goldsboro.

Roads
 The main highways in Fremont are US 117 and NC 222.

References

External links
 Official website of Fremont, NC
 Wayne-Wilson News Leader, a local newspaper

Towns in North Carolina
Towns in Wayne County, North Carolina